Lac des Écorces (French for "Bark Lake") is a freshwater lake on the boundary of Mont-Laurier and Lac-des-Écorces, in the Antoine-Labelle Regional County Municipality, in the administrative region of Laurentides, Quebec, Canada.

Toponymy 
The toponym "Lac des Écorces" was made official on 5 December 1968 at the Place Names Bank of the Commission de toponymie du Québec.

See also 
 Lac-des-Écorces Water Aerodrome
 Kiamika Reservoir Regional Park

References

Further reading

External links 
 Official site of the Municipality of Lac-aux-Écorces

Lakes of Laurentides
Antoine-Labelle Regional County Municipality